Ottumwa is an impact crater on Mars, located in the Lunae Palus quadrangle, on the west margin of Chryse Planitia and just east of Nilokeras Fossa.  It was named in 1976 after Ottumwa, a town in Iowa, United States.

Ottumwa is a complex crater, having a central peak.

References 

Impact craters on Mars